Cheshivan (also Romanized as Cheshīvān; also known as Cheshevān and Cheyshvān) is a village in Pol Beh Pain Rural District, Simakan District, Jahrom County, Fars Province, Iran. At the 2006 census, its population was 137, in 31 families.

References 

Populated places in Jahrom County